CORDIS is an American progressive chamber music group featuring cimbalom, percussion, cello, guitar, and keyboards.

History

Here On Out
Richard Grimes, Andrew Beall, and Jeremy Harman formed CORDIS in Boston, MA in 2008. The group was initially created to serve as a performance vehicle for Grimes' compositions. The ensemble's first album, Here On Out was recorded at Q Division Studios in Boston, MA in 2007.  The album was produced by Tom Durack and Grimes, mixed by Durack, and released on the group's own label, Landspeed Records (a name taken from Minneapolis punk pioneers, Hüsker Dü's first album, Land Speed Record.) in October 2008. Here On Out was hailed as a critical success, but by 2010 the group's focus had become refined to exploring more experimental timbres, with Grimes directing his role in the ensemble solely on the electric cimbalom.

Seams
CORDIS' second album, Seams, was released in September, 2016. The album was produced by Sam Kassirer and Grimes. With pieces ranging in duration from under 30 seconds to over 10 minutes, Grimes described his writing on the Seams album as "a contest of patience versus efficiency."

Condition Blue
In Fall 2020, CORDIS will premiere Condition Blue, the first in a three-part series of performance themes incorporating elemental environments with sound. Condition Blue: The Acoustics of Aquatics offers an evocative journey into Earth's diverse water habitats, where life thrives in the most extraordinary conditions. The show features CORDIS performing on traditional and non-traditional water-based instrumentation. Condition Blue is scheduled to run until Spring 2023. Following the Condition Blue performances will be Condition Red (the effects of heat on sound) and finally Condition Clear (the effects of air on sound). The ensemble plans to release albums in conjunction with each of the Condition Series chapters.

Members
 Richard Grimes – electric cimbalom, acoustic cimbalom, (since 2008)
 Andrew Beall – percussion (since 2008)
 Jeremy Harman – cello (since 2008)
 Jeremiah Cossa – keyboards 
 Hayes Cummings - guitars

Discography
 Here on Out (2008)
 Seams (2016)

References

External links
 Official website

American instrumental musical groups